George Robinson Nixon  was  Archdeacon of Tuam  from 1939 until 1950.

Nixon  was educated at  Trinity College, Dublin and ordained in 1909. After  curacies in Tuam, Dublin and Kilnamanagh he became  Rector of Killasnet in 1914, after which he was the Incumbent at Turlough. He was the Diocese of Tuam's Inspector of Schools from 1917 until 1942; Rural Dean of Tuam from 1922 to 1944;and Domestic Chaplain to the Bishop of Tuam from 1923 to 1944. During this period these would have been John Orr, John Mason Harden, William Hardy Holmes (and John Winthrop Crozier).

References

Irish Anglicans
Archdeacons of Tuam
Alumni of Trinity College Dublin
Year of birth missing
Year of death missing